Royal residences of the Chakri Dynasty in Thailand include the Grand Palace, nineteen royal palaces (official residences of the king and uparaja stipulated as such by royal decree) and other palaces (wang) used by the king or other members of the royal family. The Bureau of the Royal Household administers and manages several current royal palaces. Historical palaces from earlier periods exist mainly in the ruins of Ayutthaya and Sukhothai. This page lists current and former royal residences, arranged by type of residence.

Current royal residences

 Grand Palace  Bangkok – The primary and official residence of the king, also the location of the chapel royal the Wat Phra Kaew.

Royal palaces

 Bang Pa-In Royal Palace  Ayutthaya (17th century, rebuilt 1872–89) – Occasional country residence of the king; generally open to the public.

 Dusit Palace  Bangkok (1897–1901) – Commissioned by King Chulalongkorn as an alternative primary residence to the Grand Palace.
 Vimanmek Mansion (1903) – Oldest residential building of the Dusit Palace complex; now serves as a museum.
 Abhisek Dusit Throne Hall (1904)  – Built as a banqueting and festivities space, now houses the Thai Handicrafts Museum.
 Amphorn Sathan Residential Hall (1906) – Main residential building of the Dusit Palace complex, currently the residence of King Maha Vajiralongkorn.
 Ananta Samakhom Throne Hall (1908)  – Built as an audience chamber and throne hall. Served as the seat of the Parliament of Thailand from 1932–1974.
 Chitralada Royal Villa (1913) – The primary residence of King Bhumibol Adulyadej from 1957–2016, currently home to Queen Sirikit.

Palaces
 Sa Pathum Palace  Bangkok (1916) – Currently the residence of Princess Maha Chakri Sirindhorn.
 Sukhothai Palace  Bangkok (1918) – residence of King Vajiralongkorn while Crown Prince, former home of King Prajadhipok and Queen Rambai Barni. Currently the residence of Princess Bajrakitiyabha and Princess Sirivannavari Nariratana.
 Klai Kangwon Palace  Prachuap Khiri Khan (1926) – Commissioned by King Prajadhipok; served as the primary summer residence for the late King Bhumibol Adulyadej.
 Ruen Rudee Palace  Bangkok (1957) – Former residence of the late Princess Bejaratana.
 Bhubing Palace  Chiang Mai (1962) – Winter residence of the king; open to the public when the royal family is not in residence.
 Thaksin Ratchaniwet Palace  Narathiwat (1972) – Southern country residence of the king.
 Phu Phan Palace  Sakon Nakhon (1975) – Northeastern country residence of the king.
 Chakri Bongkot Palace  Pathum Thani (1982) – Residence of Princess Chulabhorn Walailak.
 Doi Tung Royal Villa  Chiang Rai (1987) – Former residence of the late Princess Mother Srinagarindra.
 Le Dix Palace  Bangkok (1980) – Former residence of the late Princess Galyani Vadhana.
 Khao Kho Royal palace  Phetchabun (1985) - Former temporarily residence of the late King Bhumibol Adulyadej.

Former royal residences of the Rattanakosin period

Royal palaces

 Front Palace (Bangkok) (Phra Ratchawang Bowon Sathan Mongkhon)  Bangkok (1782–85) – Residence of the holder of the same title, who was also known as the uparaja or "vice king". Its grounds are now the site of the Bangkok National Museum, Thammasat University, Bunditpatanasilpa Institute, the National Theatre and the Office of the Council of State.
 Rear Palace (Phra Ratchawang Bowon Sathan Phimuk)  Bangkok (built in the reign of King Rama I) – Residence of the "Rear Palace" or second vice king. It is now the site of Siriraj Hospital.
 Nantha Utthayan Palace  Bangkok – Built in the reign of King Mongkut, its location is now occupied by the Royal Thai Navy.
 Pathum Wan Palace (later known as Phetchabun Palace)  Bangkok – Built in the reign of King Mongkut as a country residence; later given to Prince Chudadhuj Dharadilok. Its location is now the site of CentralWorld.
 Saranrom Palace  Bangkok (construction began 1866) – Served as temporary residence for some princes and as lodging for royal guests. It is now the site of the Museum of the Ministry of Foreign Affairs and Saranrom Park.
 Samut Prakan Palace  Samut Prakan (built in the reign of King Mongkut) – Was located opposite to Samut Prakan Station of the Paknam Railway; now demolished.
 Chan Kasem Royal Palace  Ayutthaya (16th century) – The front palace of Ayutthaya, destroyed and abandoned following the Fall of Ayutthaya. Rebuilt and served as country residence for King Mongkut's travels to Ayutthaya; superseded by Bang Pa-in Palace and is now the site of Chan Kasem National Museum.
 Thak Phikun Palace  Saraburi (17th century, rebuilt in the reign of King Mongkut) – Served as residence during royal pilgrimages to the Buddha footprint at Phra Phutthabat. Now abandoned.
 Phra Nakhon Khiri Palace  Phetchaburi (1859) – Served as country residence during the reigns of Kings Mongkut and Chulalongkorn; now the Phra Nakhon Khiri historical park.
 Si Tha Palace  Saraburi (built in the reign of King Mongkut) – Royal residence of Pinklao, the second king; now abandoned.
 Phaya Thai Palace  Bangkok (1909) – Served as country residence of King Chulalongkorn and Queen Saovabha Phongsri, and later King Vajiravudh. Converted to a hotel, then a hospital; now within the grounds of Phramongkutklao Hospital and College of Medicine.
 Sanam Chandra Palace  Nakhon Pathom (1902–11) – Country residence of King Vajiravudh. Later became a campus of Silpakorn University; now a museum.
 Phra Chuthathut Palace (Phra Chuthathut Ratchathan)  Chonburi – Served as a summer residence during the reign of King Chulalongkorn; now a research centre and museum of Chulalongkorn University.
 Royal palace at Khao Sattanat  Ratchaburi (1870) – Served as a country residence for King Chulalongkorn; now the site of Wat Khao Wang, a Buddhist temple.
 Royal palace on Mae Klong River  Ratchaburi – Commissioned by King Chulalongkorn but converted to a barracks (and later a police station) before completion.
 Rattanarangsan Palace  Ranong (1890) – Built for King Chulalongkorn by Khaw Su Jiang, a local noble merchant; now the site of the town hall and a museum commemorating the palace.
 Phra Ram Ratchaniwet (Ban Puen Palace)  Phetchaburi (1910) – Commissioned by King Chulalongkorn as a country residence; now a museum operated by the Royal Thai Army.

Palaces

 Tha Phra Palace  Bangkok (1782) – Served as the residence of Prince Chetsadabodin (Rama III) and Prince Narisara Nuvadtivongs, among others; now the main campus of Silpakorn University.
 Burapha Phirom Palace  Bangkok – Rebuilt in 1875 to serve as the residence of Prince Bhanurangsi Savangwongse, the palace has since been demolished, and its former grounds are now a commercial area known as Wang Burapha.
 Dara Phirom Palace  Chiang Mai – Residence of Princess Dara Rasmi after the death of King Chulalongkorn; now a museum managed by Chulalongkorn University
 Windsor Palace  Bangkok – Built in the reign of King Chulalongkorn to serve as the residence of Crown Prince Vajirunhis. The palace became part of Chulalongkorn University after the prince's death; its former location is now the site of the National Stadium.
 Bang Khun Phrom Palace  Bangkok (1899) – Former residence of Prince Paribatra Sukhumbandhu; now the Bank of Thailand Museum.
 Suan Sunandha Palace (Sunandha Garden)  Bangkok – Formerly part of Dusit Palace; now the campus of Suan Sunandha Rajabhat University.
 Paruskavan Palace  Bangkok (1904–05) – Former residence of Prince Chakrabongse Bhuvanath; now the headquarters of the Metropolitan Police Bureau and the National Intelligence Agency.
 Ladawan Palace  Bangkok (1906) – Former residence of Prince Yugala Dighambara; now the site of the Crown Property Bureau.
 Thewet Palace  Bangkok – Residence of Prince Kitiyakara Voralaksana and his descendants.
 Chakrabongse Palace  Bangkok (1909–1910) – former residence of Prince Chakrabongse Bhuvanath; now the site of Chakrabongse Villas, a private resort, and the headquarters of Green World Foundation and River Books.
 Chan Kasem Palace  Bangkok (1909–11) – Built as the residence of then-Crown Prince Vajiravudh, the prince succeeded his father before the palace's completion. It is now the site of the Ministry of Education.
 Varadis Palace  Bangkok (1911) – Former residence of Prince Damrong Rajanubhab; now a museum.
 Plai Nern Palace  Bangkok (1914) – Former residence of Prince Narisara Nuvadtivongs; now a museum.
 Thewawet Palace  Bangkok (1914) – Former residence of Prince Devawongse Varopakarn; now a museum of the Bank of Thailand.
 Mrigadayavan Palace  Phetchaburi (1923–24) – Summer residence of King Vajiravudh; Now owned by the Border Patrol Police and open to the public.
 Suan Pakkad Palace  Bangkok (1952) – Former residence of Prince Chumbhotbongs Paribatra; now a museum.

Historical (pre-Rattanakosin) royal palaces

 Royal Palace of Sukhothai (13th – 15th centuries)  Sukhothai – Now part of Sukhothai Historical Park
 Royal Palace of Ayutthaya (14th – 18th centuries)  Ayutthaya – Now part of Ayutthaya Historical Park
 Front Palace of Ayutthaya  Currently houses the Chan Kasem National Museum 
 Rear Palace of Ayutthaya  Largely destroyed
 Chan Palace  Phitsanulok (15th century)
 King Narai's Palace (Phra Narai Ratchaniwet)  Lopburi (1666) – Now a museum
 Phra Racha Wang Derm (Thonburi Palace)  Bangkok (1768) – Royal palace of King Taksin and Rama II (as a prince); now site of the Royal Thai Navy headquarters.

References
 
 

 
Thai royal residences
Royal residences
Thai
Thai